Percha is a comune in South Tyrol, Italy.

Percha may also refer to:

Percha (Starnberg), a district of Starnberg, Germany; a separate village until 1978
, a district (Ortsteil) of Feldkirchen-Westerham, Germany
Percha Creek, near Hillsboro, New Mexico, United States
Percha Formation or Percha Shale, a geologic formation in New Mexico, United States
Percha City, the original name of Kingston, New Mexico, United States
Percha Island, a former name of Sumatra
Percha a 2013 album by Ukrainian band Trystavisim

See also

Perchas, Puerto Rico
Perca (disambiguation)

de:Percha